Wayne Sharrocks is an English author of psychological thrillers.  He was born in Camden, London and had a career in animal welfare after university. In 2005 he secured a 3 book publishing contract with Pegasus Books. He started to write novels whilst living in Blo Norton on the Norfolk/Suffolk border. His first book Redemption published in 2006 was nominated for both the McKitterick Prize and Guardian First Book Award. His second, Dominion was published in 2007, with Kismet on worldwide release in 2010.

References

External links
www.myspace.com/waynesharrocks
http://www.waynesharrocks.co.uk/

1965 births
Living people
People from Camden Town
21st-century English novelists
English male novelists
21st-century English male writers